

Bandy

World Championship
 January 31 – February 14: 2016 Bandy World Championship in  Ulyanovsk Oblast
 Division A:  defeated , 6–1, to win their fourth consecutive and tenth overall Bandy World Championship title.  took the bronze medal.
 Division B:  defeated , 5–4, in the final, and is qualified for Division A next year.  took third place.

Women's World Championship
 February 18–21, 2016: 2016 Women's Bandy World Championship in  Roseville, Minnesota
  defeated , 1–0, to win their seventh women's title.  took the bronze medal.

World Cup
 Final game, November 16, 2015: HK Yenisey (Russia) - Sandvikens AIK (Sweden), 5–0

National champions
 Finland: Botnia-69 (men), Sudet (women)
 Norway: Stabæk IF (men), Stabæk IF (women)
 Russia: HK Yenisey (men), Rekord Irkutsk (women)
 Sweden: Västerås SK (men), Kareby IS (women)
 Ukraine: Dynamo Kharkiv (men)
 United States: Bandolier BC (men)

International Youth Championships
 January 2016: U23 World Championship
 Winner:  Sweden

Bobsleigh and skeleton

IBSF World championships and Winter Youth Olympics
 January 19–23: IBSF Junior World Championships 2016 in  Winterberg
 Two-man junior bobsleigh winners:  (Johannes Lochner, Joshua Bluhm)
 Four-man junior bobsleigh winners:  (Johannes Lochner, Sebastian Mrowka, Joshua Bluhm, Matthias Sommer)
 Two-woman junior bobsleigh winners:  (Stephanie Schneider, Lisa Marie Buckwitz)
 Men's skeleton winner:  Nikita Tregubov
 Women's skeleton winner:  Lelde Priedulēna
 February 8–21: FIBT World Championships 2016 in  Innsbruck–Igls
 Two-man bobsleigh winners:  (Francesco Friedrich, Thorsten Margis)
 Four-man bobsleigh winners:  (Oskars Melbārdis, Daumants Dreiškens, Arvis Vilkaste, Jānis Strenga)
 Two-woman bobsleigh winners:  (Anja Schneiderheinze-Stöckel, Annika Drazek)
 Men's skeleton winner:  Martins Dukurs
 Women's skeleton winner:  Tina Hermann
 Team winners:  (Axel Jungk, Anja Schneiderheinze-Stöckel, Franziska Bertels, Tina Hermann, Johannes Lochner, Tino Paasche)
 February 19: Skeleton at the 2016 Winter Youth Olympics in  Lillehammer
 Boys' winners:   Evgenii Rukosuev;   Alexander Hestengen;   Robin Schneider
 Girls' winners:   Ashleigh Fay Pittaway;   Hannah Neise;   Agathe Bessard
 February 20: Bobsleigh at the 2016 Winter Youth Olympics in  Lillehammer
 Boys' monobob winners:   Jonas Jannusch;   Maksim Ivanov;   Kristian Olsen
 Girls' monobob winners:   Laura Nolte;   Mercedes Schulte;   Kelsea Purchall

2015–16 Bobsleigh and Skeleton World Cups
 November 22–29, 2015: IBSF World Cup #1 in  Altenberg, Saxony
 Two-man bobsleigh winners:  (Francesco Friedrich, Thorsten Margis)
 Four-man bobsleigh winners:  (Francesco Friedrich, Martin Putze, Jannis Bäcker, Thorsten Margis)
 Two-woman bobsleigh winners:  (Kaillie Humphries, Melissa Lotholz)
 Men's skeleton winner:  Martins Dukurs
 Women's skeleton winner:  Laura Deas
 November 30 – December 6, 2015: IBSF World Cup #2 in  Winterberg
 Two-man bobsleigh winners:  (Francesco Friedrich, Thorsten Margis)
 Four-man bobsleigh winners:  (Francesco Friedrich, Martin Putze, Jannis Bäcker, Thorsten Margis)
 Two-woman bobsleigh winners:  (Jamie Greubel, Cherrelle Garrett)
 Men's skeleton winner:  Martins Dukurs
 Women's skeleton winner:  Tina Hermann
 December 7–13, 2015: IBSF World Cup #3 in  Schönau am Königsee #1
 Two-man bobsleigh winners:  (Francesco Friedrich, Thorsten Margis)
 Four-man bobsleigh winners:  (Nico Walther, Gregor Bermbach, Marko Hübenbecker, Eric Franke)
 Two-woman bobsleigh winners:  (Kaillie Humphries, Melissa Lotholz)
 Men's skeleton winner:  Martins Dukurs
 Women's skeleton winner:  Tina Hermann
 January 3–9: IBSF World Cup #4 in  Lake Placid, New York
 Two-man bobsleigh winners:  (Steven Holcomb, Carlo Valdes)
 Four-man bobsleigh winners:  (Maximilian Arndt, Martin Putze, Ben Heber, Kevin Korona)
 Two-woman bobsleigh winners:  (Jamie Greubel, Cherrelle Garrett)
 Men's skeleton winner:  Martins Dukurs
 Women's skeleton winner:  Annie O'Shea
 January 10–16: IBSF World Cup #5 in  Park City, Utah
 Note: no two-man bobsleigh event here.
 Four-man bobsleigh #1 winners:  (Alexander Kasjanov, Ilvir Huzin, Aleksei Pushkarev, Aleksey Zaytsev)
 Four-man bobsleigh #2 winners:  (Nico Walther, Marko Hübenbecker, Christian Poser, Eric Franke)
 Two-woman bobsleigh winners:  (Kaillie Humphries, Melissa Lotholz)
 Men's skeleton winner:  Martins Dukurs
 Women's skeleton winner:  Tina Hermann
 January 18–23: IBSF World Cup #6 in  Whistler, British Columbia
 Note: no four-man bobsleigh event here.
 Two-man bobsleigh #1 winners:  (Rico Peter, Thomas Amrhein)
 Two-man bobsleigh #2 winners:  (Christopher Spring, Lascelles Brown)
 Two-woman bobsleigh winners:  (Kaillie Humphries, Melissa Lotholz)
 Men's skeleton winner:  Martins Dukurs
 Women's skeleton winner:  Tina Hermann
 February 1–7: IBSF World Cup #7 in  St. Moritz
 Two-man bobsleigh winners:  (Beat Hefti, Alex Baumann)
 Four-man bobsleigh winners:  (Maximilian Arndt, Kevin Korona, Martin Putze, Ben Heber)
 Two-woman bobsleigh winners:  (Elana Meyers, Lauren Gibbs)
 Men's skeleton winner:  Yun Sung-bin
 Women's skeleton winner:  Janine Flock
 February 22–28: IBSF World Cup #8 (final) in  Schönau am Königsee #2
 Two-man bobsleigh winners:  (Won Yun-jong, Seo Young-woo)
 Four-man bobsleigh winners:  (Maximilian Arndt, Alexander Rödiger, Kevin Kuske, Martin Putze)
 Two-woman bobsleigh winners:  (Elana Meyers, Kehri Jones)
 Men's skeleton winner:  Martins Dukurs
 Women's skeleton winner:  Tina Hermann

Bobsleigh IBSF North American Cup 2015–2016
 November 9–14, 2015: IBSF North American Cup #1 in  Calgary
 Men's two-man #1 winners:  (Codie Bascue / Evan Weinstock)
 Men's two-man #2 winners:  (Christopher Spring / Derek Plug)
 Men's four-man #1 winners:  (Justin Kripps, Alexander Kopacz, Joshua Kirkpatrick, Ben Coakwell)
 Men's four-man #2 winners:  (Codie Bascue, David Cremin, Nathan Gilsleider, Evan Weinstock)
 Women's two-man #1 winners:  (Christine de Bruin / Cynthia Appiah)
 Women's two-man #2 winners:  (Christine de Bruin / Cynthia Appiah)
 November 27–29, 2015: IBSF North American Cup #2 in  Whistler
 Open two-man #1 winners:  (Nick Poloniato, Cameron Stones)
 Open two-man #2 winners:  (Nick Poloniato, Joey Nemet)
 Women's two-man #1 winners:  (Christine de Bruin / Cynthia Appiah)
 Women's two-man #2 winners:  (Brittany Reinbolt, Bonnie Kilis)
 February 26–29, 2016: IBSF North American Cup #3 in  Park City
 Men's two-man #1 winners:  (Codie Bascue / Nathan Gilsleider)
 Men's two-man #2 winners:  (Codie Bascue / Nathan Gilsleider)
 Women's bobsleigh #1 winner:  Nicole Vogt
 Women's bobsleigh #2 winner:  Katie Eberling
 Men's four-man #1 winners:  (Justin Olsen, Brent Fogt, Luis Moreira, Evan Weinstock)
 Men's four-man #2 winners:  (Codie Bascue, David Cremin, Nathan Gilsleider, Adrian Adams)

Bobsleigh IBSF Europe Cup 2015–2016
 November 27–29, 2015: IBSF Europe Cup #1 in  Winterberg
 Open two-man #1 winners:  (Johannes Lochner, Gregor Bermbach)
 Open two-man #2 winners:  (Johannes Lochner, Joshua Bluhm)
 Women's two-man #1 winners:  (Sabrina Duljevic, Lisa-Sophie Gericke)
 Women's two-man #2 winners:  (Alexandra Rodionova, Yulia Shokshueva)
 Open four-man #1 winners:  (Johannes Lochner, Gregor Bermbach, Tino Paasche, Christian Rasp)
 Open four-man #2 winners:  (Johannes Lochner, Gregor Bermbach, Joshua Bluhm, Christian Rasp)
 December 4–5, 2015: IBSF Europe Cup #2 in  Altenberg
 Men's two-man winners:  (Johannes Lochner, Sebastian Mrowka)
 Women's two-man winners:  (Alexandra Rodionova, Yulia Shokshueva)
 Open four-man winners:  (Johannes Lochner, Gregor Bermbach, Sebastian Mrowka, Christian Rasp)
 December 19–20, 2015: IBSF Europe Cup #3 in  Sigulda
 Men's two-man #1 winners:  (Uģis Žaļims, Intars Dambis)
 Men's two-man #2 winners:  (Oskars Melbārdis, Jānis Strenga)
 Women's two-man #1 winners:  (Alexandra Rodionova, Yulia Shokshueva)
 Women's two-man #2 winners:  (Alexandra Rodionova, Yulia Shokshueva)
 January 8–10, 2016: IBSF Europe Cup #4 in  Schönau am Königssee
 Men's two-man #1 winners:  (Johannes Lochner, Matthias Kagerhuber)
 Women's two-man #1 winners:  (Stephanie Schneider, Lisa Marie Buckwitz)
 Open four-man winner:  (Johannes Lochner, Sebastian Mrowka, Joshua Bluhm, Matthias Sommer)
 Open four-man winner:  (Johannes Lochner, Sebastian Mrowka, Joshua Bluhm, Matthias Sommer)
 January 14–17, 2016: IBSF Europe Cup #5 in  Innsbruck–Igls
 Men's two-man winners:  (Johannes Lochner, Joshua Bluhm)
 Women's two-man winners:  (Elana Meyers, Kehri Jones)
 Open four-man winner:  (Johannes Lochner, Matthias Kagerhuber, Sebastian Mrowka, Joshua Bluhm)
 Open four-man winner:  (Johannes Lochner, Matthias Sommer, Sebastian Mrowka, Joshua Bluhm)
 January 27–30, 2016: IBSF Europe Cup #6 (final) in  St. Moritz
 Men's two-man winners:  (Beat Hefti, Alex Baumann)
 Women's two-man winners:  (Elana Meyers, Tara Evans)
 Open four-man winners:  (Benjamin Maier, Markus Sammer, Stefan Laussegger, Dănuț Moldovan)

Skeleton IBSF North American Cup 2015–2016
 November 12–13, 2015: IBSF North American Cup in  Calgary
 Men's skeleton #1 winner:  Ander Mirambell
 Men's skeleton #2 winner:  Ander Mirambell
 Women's skeleton #1 winner:  Jaclyn LaBerge
 Women's skeleton #2 winner:  Jaclyn LaBerge
 November 26–27, 2015: IBSF North American Cup #2 in  Whistler
 Men's skeleton #1 winner:  Rhys Thornbury
 Men's skeleton #1 winner:  Rhys Thornbury
 Women's skeleton #1 winner:  Savannah Graybill
 Women's skeleton #2 winner:  Katie Uhlaender
 March 4–5, 2016: IBSF North American Cup #3 in  Park City
 Men's skeleton #1 winner:  Ander Mirambell
 Men's skeleton #1 winner:  John Farrow
 Women's skeleton #1 winner:  Kimberley Bos
 Women's skeleton #2 winner:  Kimberley Bos

Skeleton IBSF Intercontinental Cup 2015–2016
 November 19–20, 2015: IBSF Intercontinental Cup #1 in  Lake Placid
 Men's skeleton #1 winner:  Alexander Gassner
 Men's skeleton #2 winner:  Martin Rosenberger
 Women's skeleton #1 winner:  Katie Uhlaender
 Women's skeleton #2 winner:  Katie Uhlaender
 December 2–3, 2015: IBSF Intercontinental Cup #2 in  Whistler
 Men's skeleton #1 winner:  Martin Rosenberger
 Men's skeleton #2 winner:  Rhys Thornbury
 Women's skeleton #1 winner:  Lanette Prediger
 Women's skeleton #2 winner:  Katie Uhlaender
 January 7–8, 2016: IBSF Intercontinental Cup #3 in  Innsbruck–Igls
 Men's skeleton #1 winner:  Aleksandr Tretyakov
 Men's skeleton #2 winner:  Nikita Tregubov
 Women's skeleton #1 winner:  Elena Nikitina
 Women's skeleton #2 winner:  Elena Nikitina
 January 14–15, 2016: IBSF Intercontinental Cup #4 (final) in  Schönau am Königssee
 Men's skeleton #1 winner:  Nikita Tregubov
 Men's skeleton #2 winner:  Aleksandr Tretyakov
 Women's skeleton #1 winner:  Anna Fernstaedt
 Women's skeleton #2 winner:  Anna Fernstaedt

Skeleton IBSF Europa Cup 2015–2016
 December 4–5, 2015: IBSF Europa Cup #1 in  Altenberg
 Men's skeleton #1 winner:  Sergey Chudinov
 Men's skeleton #2 winners:  Fabian Küchler /  Alexander Mutovin
 Women's skeleton #1 winner:  Olga Potylitsina
 Women's skeleton #2 winner:  Maxi Just
 December 19–20, 2015: IBSF Europe Cup #2 in  Sigulda
 Men's skeleton #1 winner:  Alexander Mutovin
 Men's skeleton #2 winner:  Ivo Steinbergs
 Women's skeleton #1 winner:  Mirela Rahneva
 Women's skeleton #2 winner:  Mirela Rahneva
 January 14–15, 2016: IBSF Europe Cup #3 in  Schönau am Königssee
 Women's skeleton #1 winner:  Maxi Just
 Women's skeleton #2 winner:  Maxi Just
 Men's skeleton #1 winner:  Dominic Rady
 Men's skeleton #2 winner:  Dominic Rady
 January 27–28, 2016: IBSF Europe Cup #4 (final) in  St. Moritz
 Men's skeleton #1 winner:  David Swift
 Men's skeleton #2 winner:  Fabian Küchler
 Women's skeleton #1 winner:  Mirela Rahneva
 Women's skeleton #2 winner:  Mirela Rahneva

Curling

World curling championships and Winter Youth Olympics
 September 12–19, 2015: 2015 World Mixed Curling Championship in  Bern (debut event)
  (skip: Steffen Walstad) defeated  (skip: Rasmus Wranå), 5–3, to win the inaugural WCF's World Mixed Curling Championship title. 
  (skip: Ji Yansong) took the bronze medal.
 February 12–21: 2016 Winter Youth Olympics in  Lillehammer
 Mixed doubles winners: 
   Yako Matsuzawa and  Philipp Hösli
   Han Yu and  Ross Whyte
   Zhao Ruiyi and  Andreas Hårstad
 Mixed team winners:  ;  ;  
 February 21–28: 2016 World Wheelchair Curling Championship in  Lucerne
  (skip: Andrey Smirnov) defeated  (skip: Rune Lorentsen), 7–4, to win their second consecutive and third overall World Wheelchair Curling Championship title. 
  (skip: Yang Hui-tae) took the bronze medal.
 March 5–13: 2016 World Junior Curling Championships in  Copenhagen
 Note: this event was slated to Erzurum, but the WCF took it away due to terrorism fears.
  (skip: Matt Dunstone) took the bronze medal.
  (skip: Kim Min-ji) took the bronze medal.
 March 19–27: 2016 Ford World Women's Curling Championship in  Swift Current
  (skip: Binia Feltscher) defeated  (skip: Satsuki Fujisawa), 9–6, to win Switzerland's third consecutive and sixth overall World Women's Curling Championship title.
  (skip: Anna Sidorova) took the bronze medal.
 April 2–10: 2016 World Men's Curling Championship in  Basel 
 Note: this event is a PyeongChang 2018 Olympic qualifying one.
  (skip: Kevin Koe) defeated  (skip: Rasmus Stjerne), 5–3, to win Canada's 35th World Men's Curling Championship title. 
 The  (skip: John Shuster) took the bronze medal.
 April 16–23: 2016 World Senior and Mixed Doubles Curling Championships in  Karlstad
 Men's senior:  (skip: Mats Wranå) defeated  (skip: Randy Neufeld), 7–4, to win Sweden's first World Senior Curling Championships title.
  (skip: Peter Wilson) took the bronze medal.
 Women's senior:  (skip: Jackie Lockhart) defeated  (skip: Monika Wagner), 5–4, to win Scotland's third World Senior Curling Championships title.
  (skip: Gunilla Arfwidsson-Edlund) took the bronze medal.
 Mixed doubles:  (Alexander Krushelnitskiy and Anastasia Bryzgalova) defeated  (Ba Dexin and Wang Rui), 7–5, to win Russia's second World Mixed Doubles Curling Championship title. 
 The  (Joe Polo and Tabitha Peterson) took the bronze medal.

Curling Canada season of champions
 December 2–6, 2015: 2015 Canada Cup of Curling in  Grande Prairie
 Men:  Kevin Koe (skip) defeated  Mike McEwen (skip), 7–3, to win his first Canada Cup of Curling title.
 Women:  Rachel Homan (skip) defeated  Valerie Sweeting (skip), 8–7, to win her first Canada Cup of Curling title.
 January 14–17: 2016 Continental Cup of Curling in  Paradise, Nevada
 Team / North America defeated Team  World, with the score of 30.5–29.5 total points.
 February 20–28: 2016 Scotties Tournament of Hearts in  Grande Prairie
  Chelsea Carey (skip) defeated  Krista McCarville (skip), 7–6, to win Alberta's second Scotties Tournament of Hearts title. 
 Team  (Jennifer Jones (skip)) took the bronze medal.
 March 5–13: 2016 Tim Hortons Brier in  Ottawa
  Kevin Koe (skip) defeated  Brad Gushue (skip), 9–5, to win Alberta's second Tim Hortons Brier title.
  Brad Jacobs (skip) took the bronze medal.

Continental championships
 November 7–14, 2015: 2015 Pacific-Asia Curling Championships in  Almaty
 Men:  (skip: Kim Soo-hyuk) defeated  (skip: Yusuke Morozumi), 11–7, to win their nation's second Pacific-Asia Curling Championships title. 
  (skip: Zang Jialiang) took the bronze medal.
 Women:  (skip: Satsuki Fujisawa) defeated  (skip: Kim Ji-sun), 8–7, to win their nation's 14th Pacific-Asia Curling Championships title. 
  (skip: Liu Sijia) took the bronze medal.
 November 20–28, 2015: 2015 European Curling Championships in  Esbjerg
 Men:  (skip: Niklas Edin) defeated  (skip: Peter de Cruz), 7–6, to win their nation's second consecutive and ninth overall European Curling Championship title. 
  (skip: Thomas Ulsrud took the bronze medal.
 Women:  (skip: Anna Sidorova) defeated  (skip: Eve Muirhead), 6–4, to win their nation's third European Curling Championship title. 
  (skip: Oona Kauste) took the bronze medal.

World Curling Tour and Grand Slam of Curling
 September 8–13, 2015: 2015 GSOC Tour Challenge in  Paradise, Newfoundland and Labrador (debut event)
 Men:  Kevin Koe (skip) defeated  Brad Gushue (skip), 4–3, to win this inaugural GSOC Tour Challenge title. 
 Women:  Silvana Tirinzoni (skip) defeated  Rachel Homan (skip), 6–5, to win this inaugural GSOC Tour Challenge title. 
 October 27 – November 1, 2015: 2015 The Masters Grand Slam of Curling in  Truro, Nova Scotia
 Men:  Mike McEwen (skip) defeated  Jim Cotter (skip), 5–3, to win his second Masters Grand Slam of Curling title. 
 Women:  Rachel Homan (skip) defeated  Valerie Sweeting (skip), 6–4, to win her third Masters Grand Slam of Curling title.
 November 11–15, 2015: 2015 The National in  Oshawa
 Men:  Brad Gushue (skip) defeated  Reid Carruthers (skip), 7–2, to win his second National title.
 Women:  Rachel Homan (skip) defeated fellow Ontario skip (Tracy Fleury), 5–4, to win the inaugural National title for women.
 December 8–13, 2015: 2015 Canadian Open of Curling in  Yorkton
 Men:  John Epping (skip) defeated  Brad Gushue (skip), 7–4, to win his first Canadian Open of Curling title. 
 Women:  Rachel Homan (skip) defeated  Jennifer Jones (skip), 8–7, to win her first Canadian Open of Curling title. 
 March 16–20: 2016 Elite 10 in  Victoria, British Columbia (men only)
  Brad Gushue (skip) defeated  Reid Carruthers (skip), 4–3 in an extra end, to win their first Elite 10 title. 
 April 12–17: 2016 Players' Championship in  Toronto
 Men:  Brad Gushue (skip) defeated  Brad Jacobs, 5–4, to win his first Players' Championship title. 
 Women:  Eve Muirhead (skip) defeated  Jennifer Jones (skip), 9–6, to win her second consecutive and third overall Players' Championship title.
 April 26 – May 1: 2016 Humpty's Champions Cup in  Sherwood Park (debut event)
 Men:  Reid Carruthers (skip) defeated  John Epping (skip), 4–3, to win the inaugural Champions Cup title. 
 Women:  Jennifer Jones (skip) defeated  Rachel Homan (skip), 7–5, to win the inaugural Champions Cup title.

Figure skating

International figure skating events and Winter Youth Olympics
 January 25–31: 2016 European Figure Skating Championships in  Bratislava
 Men's singles:  Javier Fernández
 Ladies' singles:  Evgenia Medvedeva
 Pairs:  Tatiana Volosozhar / Maxim Trankov
 Ice dance:  Gabriella Papadakis / Guillaume Cizeron
 February 13–20: 2016 Winter Youth Olympics in  Lillehammer
 Boys' singles:   Sōta Yamamoto;   Deniss Vasiļjevs;   Dmitri Aliev
 Girls' singles:   Polina Tsurskaya;   Maria Sotskova;   Elizabet Tursynbayeva
 Pairs:   Ekaterina Borisova / Dmitry Sopot;   Anna Dušková / Martin Bidař;   Alina Ustimkina / Nikita Volodin
 Ice dance:   Anastasia Shpilevaya / Grigory Smirnov;   Chloe Lewis / Logan Bye;   Anastasia Skoptsova / Kirill Aleshin
 Mixed NOC team:  Team Desire;  Team Future;  Team Discovery
 February 16–21: 2016 Four Continents Figure Skating Championships in  Taipei
 Men's singles:  Patrick Chan
 Ladies' singles:  Satoko Miyahara
 Pairs:  Sui Wenjing / Han Cong
 Ice dance:  Maia Shibutani / Alex Shibutani
 March 14–20: 2016 World Junior Figure Skating Championships in  Debrecen
 Men's singles:  Daniel Samohin
 Ladies' singles:  Marin Honda
 Pairs:  Anna Dušková / Martin Bidař
 Ice dance:  Lorraine McNamara / Quinn Carpenter
 March 28 – April 3: 2016 World Figure Skating Championships in  Boston
 Men's singles:  Javier Fernández
 Ladies' singles:  Evgenia Medvedeva
 Pairs:  Meagan Duhamel / Eric Radford
 Ice dance:  Gabriella Papadakis / Guillaume Cizeron

2015–16 ISU Grand Prix of Figure Skating
 October 23–25, 2015: 2015 Skate America in  Milwaukee
 Men's singles:  Max Aaron
 Ladies' singles:  Evgenia Medvedeva
 Pairs:  (Sui Wenjing / Han Cong)
 Ice dance:  (Madison Chock / Evan Bates)
 October 30 – November 1, 2015: 2015 Skate Canada International in  Lethbridge
 Men's singles:  Patrick Chan
 Ladies' singles:  Ashley Wagner
 Pairs:  (Meagan Duhamel / Eric Radford)
 Ice dance:  (Kaitlyn Weaver / Andrew Poje)
 November 6–8, 2015: 2015 Cup of China in  Beijing
 Men's singles:  Javier Fernández
 Ladies' singles:  Mao Asada
 Pairs:  (Yuko Kavaguti / Alexander Smirnov)
 Ice dance:  (Anna Cappellini / Luca Lanotte)
 November 13–15, 2015: 2015 Trophée Éric Bompard in  Bordeaux
 Event cancelled, due to the November 2015 Paris attacks.
 November 20–22, 2015: 2015 Rostelecom Cup in  Moscow
 Men's singles:  Javier Fernández
 Ladies' singles:  Elena Radionova
 Pairs:  (Ksenia Stolbova / Fedor Klimov)
 Ice dance:  (Kaitlyn Weaver / Andrew Poje)
 November 27–29, 2015: 2015 NHK Trophy in  Nagano
 Men's singles:  Yuzuru Hanyu
 Ladies' singles:  Satoko Miyahara
 Pairs:  (Meagan Duhamel / Eric Radford)
 Ice dance:  (Maia Shibutani / Alex Shibutani)
 December 10–13, 2015: 2015–16 Grand Prix of Figure Skating Final in  Barcelona
 Men's singles:  Yuzuru Hanyu
 Ladies' singles:  Evgenia Medvedeva
 Pairs:  (Ksenia Stolbova / Fedor Klimov) 
 Ice dance:  (Kaitlyn Weaver / Andrew Poje)

2015–16 ISU Junior Grand Prix
 August 20–22: 2015 ISU Junior Grand Prix in Slovakia in  Bratislava
 Men's junior singles winner:  Roman Sadovsky
 Women's junior singles winner:  Polina Tsurskaya
 Mixed junior ice dance winners:  (Rachel Parsons/Michael Parsons)
 August 26–30: 2015 ISU Junior Grand Prix in Latvia in  Riga
 Men's junior singles winner:  Dmitri Aliev
 Women's junior singles winner:  Alisa Fedichkina
 Mixed junior ice dance winners:  (Betina Popova/Yuri Vlasenko)
 Mixed junior pairs winners:  (Renata Oganesian/Mark Bardei)
 September 2–6: 2015 ISU Junior Grand Prix in the United States in  Colorado Springs, Colorado
 Men's junior singles winner:  Nathan Chen
 Women's junior singles winner:  Yuna Shiraiwa
 Mixed junior ice dance winners:  (Lorraine McNamara / Quinn Carpenter)
 Mixed junior pairs winners:  (Anastasia A. Gubanova / Alexei Sintsov)
 September 10–12: 2015 ISU Junior Grand Prix in Austria in  Linz
 Men's junior singles winner:  Dmitri Aliev
 Women's junior singles winner:  Maria Sotskova
 Mixed junior ice dance winners:  (Alla Loboda / Pavel Drozd)
 Mixed junior pairs winners:  (Amina Atakhanova / Ilia Spiridonov)
 September 24–26: 2015 ISU Junior Grand Prix in Poland in  Toruń
 Men's junior singles winner:  Sōta Yamamoto
 Women's junior singles winner:  Polina Tsurskaya
 Mixed junior ice dance winners:  (Lorraine McNamara / Quinn Carpenter)
 Mixed junior pairs winners:  (Ekaterina Borisova / Dmitry Sopot)
 October 1–3: 2015 ISU Junior Grand Prix in Spain in  Logroño
 Men's junior singles winner:  Nathan Chen
 Women's junior singles winner:  Yuna Shiraiwa
 Mixed junior ice dance winners:  (Marie-Jade Lauriault / Romain Le Gac)
 October 8–10: 2015 ISU Junior Grand Prix in Croatia in  Zagreb
 Men's junior singles winner:  Alexander Samarin
 Women's junior singles winner:  Marin Honda
 Mixed junior ice dance winner:  (Rachel Parsons / Michael Parsons)
 December 10–12: 2015 ISU Junior Grand Prix in Spain in  Barcelona (final)
 Men's junior singles winner:  Nathan Chen
 Women's junior singles winner:  Polina Tsurskaya
 Mixed junior pairs winners:  (Ekaterina Borisova, Dmitry Sopot)
 Mixed junior ice dance winners:  (Lorraine McNamara / Quinn Carpenter)

Ice hockey

International ice hockey championships and Winter Youth Olympics
 December 26, 2015 – January 5, 2016: 2016 World Junior Ice Hockey Championships in  Helsinki
  defeated , 4–3 in overtime, to win their fourth World Junior Ice Hockey Championships title. The  won the bronze medal.
 January 8–15: 2016 IIHF World Women's U18 Championship in  St. Catharines
 The  defeated , 3–2, to win their second consecutive and fifth overall IIHF World Women's U18 Championship title.  took the bronze medal.
 February 12–21: 2016 Winter Youth Olympics in  Lillehammer
 Boys' team winners:  ;  ;  
 Boys' individual skills challenge winners:   Eduard Casaneanu;   Sebastian Cederle;   Erik Betzold
 Girls' team winners:  ;  ;  
 Girls' individual skills challenge winners:   Sena Takenaka;   Anita Muraro;   Theresa Schafzahl
 March 28 – April 4: 2016 IIHF Women's World Championship in  Kamloops
 The  defeated , 1–0 in overtime, to win their third consecutive and seventh overall IIHF Women's World Championship title.  took the bronze medal.
 April 14–24: 2016 IIHF World U18 Championships in  Grand Forks, North Dakota
  defeated , 6–1, to win their third IIHF World U18 Championships title. The  took the bronze medal.
 May 6–22: 2016 IIHF World Championship in  Moscow and Saint Petersburg
  defeated , 2–0, to win their second consecutive and 26th overall IIHF World Championship title.  took the bronze medal. 
 September 17 – October 1: 2016 World Cup of Hockey in  Toronto
  defeated  Team Europe, 2–0 in games played, to win their second consecutive World Cup of Hockey title.

National Hockey League
 October 7, 2015 – April 10, 2016: 2015–16 NHL season
 Presidents' Trophy winners:  Washington Capitals
 January 1: 2016 NHL Winter Classic at Gillette Stadium in  Foxborough, Massachusetts
 The  Montreal Canadiens defeated the  Boston Bruins 5–1.
 January 31: 61st National Hockey League All-Star Game at Bridgestone Arena in  Nashville, Tennessee
 Team Pacific defeated Team Atlantic, with the score of 1–0.
 National Hockey League All-Star Game MVP:  John Scott ( St. John's IceCaps)
 Bridgestone NHL Fastest Skater winner:  Dylan Larkin ( Detroit Red Wings)
 Honda NHL Breakaway Challenge winner:  P. K. Subban ( Montreal Canadiens)
 DraftKings NHL Accuracy Shooting winner:  John Tavares ( New York Islanders)
 Gatorade NHL Skills Challenge Relay winners: Lefty One-Timer Group
 AMP NHL Hardest Shot winner:  Shea Weber ( Nashville Predators)
 April 13 – June 12: 2016 Stanley Cup playoffs
 The  Pittsburgh Penguins defeated the  San Jose Sharks, 4–2 in games played, to win their fourth Stanley Cup title. 
 Conn Smythe Trophy Winner:  Sidney Crosby (Pittsburgh Penguins)
 June 24–25: 2016 NHL Entry Draft in  Buffalo, New York, at the First Niagara Center
 #1 pick:  Auston Matthews to the  Toronto Maple Leafs from the  ZSC Lions

2016 NHL Stadium Series
 February 21: Series #1 at the TCF Bank Stadium in Minneapolis
 The  Minnesota Wild defeated the  Chicago Blackhawks 6–1.
 February 27: Series #2 at Coors Field in Denver
 The  Detroit Red Wings defeated the  Colorado Avalanche 5–3.

NCAA
 March 12–20: 2016 NCAA National Collegiate Women's Ice Hockey Tournament Frozen Four in  Durham, New Hampshire at Whittemore Center
 The  Minnesota Golden Gophers defeated the  Boston College Eagles, 3–1, to win their sixth NCAA National Collegiate Women's Ice Hockey title.
 April 7 & 9: 2016 NCAA Division I Men's Ice Hockey Tournament Frozen Four in  Tampa, Florida, at Amalie Arena
 The  North Dakota Fighting Hawks defeated the  Quinnipiac Bobcats, 5–1, to win their eighth NCAA Division I Men's Ice Hockey title.

Kontinental Hockey League
 August 24, 2015 – April 19, 2016: 2015–16 KHL season
 Continental Cup (KHL) winner:  HC CSKA Moscow
 Top regular season scorer:  Sergei Mozyakin ( Metallurg Magnitogorsk)
 Gagarin Cup winners:  Metallurg Magnitogorsk (second Gagarin Cup title)
 January 23: 2016 Kontinental Hockey League All-Star Game in  Moscow at the VTB Ice Palace
 Team West defeated Team East, with the score of 28–23.

CWHL
 October 17, 2015 – February 21, 2016: 2015–16 CWHL season 
 Commissioner's Trophy winners:  Les Canadiennes
 January 23: 2nd Canadian Women's Hockey League All-Star Game in  Toronto
 Team Black defeated Team White 5–1.
 March 13: 2016 Clarkson Cup in  Ottawa
 The  Calgary Inferno defeated the  Montreal Les Canadiennes, 8–3, to win their first Clarkson Cup title.

NWHL
 March 5, 2016: 2016 Isobel Cup in  Newark, New Jersey at the Barnabus Health Hockey House
 The  Boston Pride defeated the   Buffalo Beauts 3–1 to win the inaugural Isobel Cup.

Allan Cup
 April 11–16: 2016 Allan Cup in  Steinbach, Manitoba at the T.G. Smith Centre
 The  Bentley Generals defeated the  South East Prairie Thunder, 4–3 in overtime, to win their third Allan Cup title.

AHL
 October 9, 2015 – April 17, 2016: 2015–16 AHL season
 Macgregor Kilpatrick Trophy winners:  Toronto Marlies
 Season MVP:  Chris Bourque
 April 20 – June 11: 2016 Calder Cup playoffs
 The  Lake Erie Monsters defeated the  Hershey Bears, 4–0 in games played, to win their first Calder Cup title.

Memorial Cup
 May 20–29: 2016 Memorial Cup in  Red Deer, Alberta, at the ENMAX Centrium
 The  London Knights defeated the  Rouyn-Noranda Huskies, 3–2 in overtime, to win their second Memorial Cup title.

Luge

International luge championships and Winter Youth Olympics
 December 17–19, 2015: 2016 FIL American-Pacific Championships in  Calgary
 Men's singles winner:  Chris Mazdzer
 Women's singles winner:  Erin Hamlin
 Men's doubles winners:  (Tristan Walker, Justin Snith)
 December 24–27, 2015: 2016 FIL Asian Championships in  Nagano (debut event)
 Men's singles winner:  Hidenari Kanayama
 Women's singles winner:  Enju Choi
 Men's doubles winners:  (Jin-Yong Park, Cho Jung-myung)
 January 15–16: Luge FIL Junior European Championships 2016 in  Altenberg
 Men's youth singles winner:  Bastian Schulte
 Women's youth singles winner:  Anna Berreiter
 Men's youth doubles #1 winners:  (Florian Löffler, Manuel Stiebing)
 Men's youth doubles #2 winners:  (Tobias Heinze, Maximilian Illmann)
 Men's junior singles winner:  Jonas Müller
 Women's junior singles winner:  Jessica Tiebel
 Mixed junior team winners:  (Jessica Tiebel, Paul-Lukas Heider, Florian Löffler, Manuel Stiebing)
 January 30–31: 2016 FIL World Luge Championships in  Schönau am Königsee
 Men's singles winner:  Felix Loch
 Men's sprint winner:  Felix Loch
 Women's singles winner:  Natalie Geisenberger
 Women's sprint winner:  Martina Kocher
 Men's doubles winners:  (Tobias Wendl, Tobias Arlt)
 Men's doubles Sprint winners:  (Tobias Wendl, Tobias Arlt)
 Team relay winners:  (Natalie Geisenberger, Felix Loch, Tobias Wendl / Tobias Arlt)
 February 5–7: Luge FIL Natural Track European Championships 2016 in  Passeier Valley
 Men's singles winner:  Thomas Kammerlander
 Women's singles winner:  Evelin Lanthaler
 Open natural track doubles winner:  (Patrick Pigneter, Florian Clara)
 February 6–7: 2016 FIL Junior World Championships in  Winterberg
 Junior men's singles winner:  Roman Repilov
 Junior women's singles winner:  Julia Taubitz
 Junior men's doubles winners:  (David Trojer, Philip Knoll)
 Team relay winners:  (Julia Taubitz, Maximilian Jung, Julius Löffler / Stiebing)
 February 13–14: 47th FIL European Championships in  Altenberg
 Men's singles winner:  Felix Loch
 Women's singles winner:  Tatjana Hüfner
 Men's doubles winners:  (Toni Eggert, Sascha Benecken)
 February 14–16: 2016 Winter Youth Olympics in  Lillehammer
 Boys' singles winners:   Kristers Aparjods;   Paul-Lukas Heider;   Reid Watts
 Girls' singles winners:   Brooke Apshkrum;   Jessica Tiebel;   Madeleine Egle
 Doubles winners:   Felix Schwarz / Lukas Gufler;   Hannes Orlamuender / Paul Gubitz;   Vsevolod Kashkin / Konstantin Korshunov
 Mixed team relay winners:  ;  ;

2015–16 Luge World Cup
 November 28–29, 2015: FIL World Cup #1 in  Innsbruck–Igls
 Men's singles winner:  Dominik Fischnaller
 Women's singles winner:  Dajana Eitberger
 Men's doubles winners:  (Toni Eggert, Sascha Benecken)
 December 4–5, 2015: FIL World Cup #2 in  Lake Placid, New York
 Men's singles winner:  Chris Mazdzer
 Women's singles winner:  Erin Hamlin
 Men's doubles winners:  (Toni Eggert, Sascha Benecken)
 December 11–12, 2015: FIL World Cup #3 in  Park City, Utah
 Men's singles winner:  Chris Mazdzer
 Women's singles winner:  Summer Britcher
 Men's doubles winners:  (Tobias Wendl, Tobias Arlt)
 December 18–19, 2015: FIL World Cup #4 in  Calgary
 Men's singles winner:  Felix Loch
 Women's singles winner:  Natalie Geisenberger
 Men's doubles winners:  (Toni Eggert, Sascha Benecken)
 January 9–10: FIL World Cup #5 in  Sigulda
 Men's singles winner:  Felix Loch
 Women's singles winner:  Tatiana Ivanova
 Men's doubles winners:  (Tobias Wendl, Tobias Arlt)
 January 16–17: FIL World Cup #6 in  Oberhof, Germany
 Men's singles winner:  Felix Loch
 Women's singles winner:  Tatjana Hüfner
 Men's doubles winners:  (Tobias Wendl, Tobias Arlt)
 February 6–7: FIL World Cup #7 in  Sochi
 Men's singles winner:  Felix Loch
 Women's singles winner:  Tatiana Ivanova
 Men's doubles winners:  (Tobias Wendl, Tobias Arlt)
 February 13–14: FIL World Cup #8 in  Altenberg
 Men's singles winner:  Felix Loch
 Women's singles winner:  Tatjana Hüfner
 Men's doubles winners:  (Toni Eggert, Sascha Benecken)
 February 20–21: FIL World Cup #9 (final) in  Winterberg
 Men's singles winner:  Stepan Fedorov
 Women's singles winner:  Tatjana Hüfner
 Men's doubles winners:  (Toni Eggert, Sascha Benecken)

2015–16 Luge Team Relay World Cup
 November 28–29, 2015: FIL World Team Relay Cup #1 in  Innsbruck–Igls
 Winners:  (Dajana Eitberger, Andi Langenhan, Toni Eggert / Sascha Benecken)
 December 4–5, 2015: FIL World Team Relay Cup #2 in  Lake Placid
 Winners:  (Erin Hamlin, Chris Mazdzer, Justin Krewson / Andrew Sherk)
 January 9–10: FIL World Team Relay Cup #3 in  Sigulda
 Winners:  (Tatjana Hüfner, Felix Loch, Tobias Wendl / Tobias Arlt)
 February 6–7: FIL World Team Relay Cup #4 in  Sochi
 Winners:  (Tatiana Ivanova, Semen Pavlichenko, Andrey Bogdanov, Andrey Medvedev)
 February 13–14: FIL World Team Relay Cup #5 in  Altenberg
 Winners:  (Tatjana Hüfner, Felix Loch, Toni Eggert / Sascha Benecken)
 February 20–21: FIL World Team Relay Cup #6 (final) in  Winterberg
 Winners:  (Arianne Jones, Mitchel Malyk, Tristan Walker / Justin Snith)

2015–16 Luge Sprint World Cup
 December 11–12, 2015: FIL Sprint World Cup #1 in  Park City
 Men's singles winner:  Wolfgang Kindl
 Women's singles winner:  Summer Britcher
 Men's doubles winners:  (Christian Oberstolz, Patrick Gruber)
 December 18–19, 2015: FIL Sprint World Cup #2 in  Calgary
 Men's singles winner:  Felix Loch
 Women's singles winner:  Summer Britcher
 Men's doubles winners:  (Tobias Wendl, Tobias Arlt)
 January 16–17: FIL Sprint World Cup #3 (final) in  Oberhof
 Men's singles winner:  Felix Loch
 Women's singles winner:  Natalie Geisenberger
 Men's doubles winners:  (Tobias Wendl, Tobias Arlt)

2015–16 FIL Luge Junior World Cup
 November 16–20: FIL Junior World Cup #1 in  Lillehammer
 Men's junior singles winner: Markus Hummer
 Men's junior doubles winners:  (Evgeny Evdokimov, Alexey Groshev)
 Men's youth singles winner:  Paul-Lukas Heider
 Men's youth doubles winners:  (Felix Schwarz, Lukas Gufler)
 Women's junior singles winner:  Madeleine Egle
 Women's youth singles winner:  Olesya Mikhaylenko
 Men's junior team winners: 
 Mixed junior/youth team relay winners: 
 November 27–28: FIL Junior World Cup #2 in  Sigulda
 Men's youth singles winner:  Paul-Lukas Heider
 Women's youth singles winner:  Kristina Shamova
 Men's youth doubles winners:  (Andrej Shander, Semen Mikov)
 Men's junior singles winner:  Daniil Lebedev
 Men's junior doubles winners:  (Grigoriy Voloskov, Mikhail Dementiev)
 Women's youth singles winner:  Olesya Mikhaylenko
 December 5–6: FIL Junior World Cup #3 in  Schönau am Königssee
 Men's youth singles winner:  Thomas Jaensch
 Women's youth singles winner:  Tina Müller
 Men's youth doubles winners:  (Tobias Heinze, Maximilian Illmann)
 Men's junior singles winner:  Theo Gruber
 Women's junior singles winner:  Jessica Tiebel
 Men's junior doubles winners:  (Evgeny Evdokimov, Alexey Groshev)
 December 11–12: FIL Junior World Cup #4 in  Innsbruck
 Men's youth singles winner:  Paul-Lukas Heider
 Women's youth singles winner:  Tina Müller
 Men's youth doubles winners:  (Tobias Heinze, Maximilian Illmann)
 Men's junior singles winner:  Krisrers Aparjods
 Women's junior singles winner:  Jessica Tiebel
 Men's junior doubles winners:  (Evgeny Evdokimov, Alexey Groshev)
 Mixed junior team winners: 
 January 15–16: FIL Junior World Cup #5 in  Altenberg
 Men's youth singles winner:  Bastian Schulte
 Women's youth singles winner:  Anna Berreiter
 Men's youth doubles #1 winners:  (Florian Löffler, Manuel Stiebing)
 Men's youth doubles #2 winners:  (Tobias Heinze, Maximilian Illmann)
 Men's junior singles winner:  Jonas Müller
 Women's junior singles winner:  Jessica Tiebel
 Mixed junior team winners: 
 January 22–23: FIL Junior World Cup #6 (final) in  Oberhof
 Men's youth singles winner:  Fabian Malleier
 Women's youth singles winner:  Anna Berreiter
 Men's youth doubles #1 winners:  (Florian Löffler, Manuel Stiebing)
 Men's youth doubles #2 winners:  (Andrey Shander, Semen Mikov)
 Men's junior singles winner:  Jonas Müller
 Women's junior singles winner:  Tina Müller
 Mixed junior team winners:

Luge FIL Natural Track World Cup 2015–2016
 December 12–13, 2015: FIL Natural Track World Cup #1 in  Kühtai Ski Resort
 Men's natural singles winner:  Patrick Pigneter
 Women's natural singles winner:  Tina Unterberger
 Open natural track doubles winners:  (Patrick Pigneter, Florian Clara)
 January 9–10, 2016: FIL Natural Track World Cup #2 in  Latsch
 Men's natural singles winner:  Patrick Pigneter
 Women's natural singles winner:  Evelin Lanthaler
 Open natural track doubles winners:  (Patrick Pigneter, Florian Clara)
 January 16–17, 2016: FIL Natural Track World Cup #3 in  Vatra Dornei
 Men's natural singles winner:  Patrick Pigneter
 Women's natural singles winner:  Evelin Lanthaler
 Open natural track doubles winners:  (Patrick Pigneter, Florian Clara)
 January 23–24, 2016: FIL Natural Track World Cup #4 in  Moscow
 Men's natural singles winner:  Aleksandr Yegorov
 Women's natural singles winner:  Yekaterina Lavrentyeva
 Open natural track doubles winners:  (Patrick Pigneter, Florian Clara)
 January 29–31, 2016: FIL Natural Track World Cup #5 in  Deutschnofen
 Men's natural singles winner:  Alex Gruber
 Women's natural singles winner:  Evelin Lanthaler
 Open natural track doubles winners:  (Patrick Pigneter, Florian Clara)

Luge FIL Junior Natural Track World Cup 2015–2016
 December 12–13, 2015: FIL Natural Junior Track World Cup #1 in  Winterleiten
 Men's natural singles winner:  Fabian Achenrainer
 Women's natural singles winner:  Theresa Maurer
 Open natural track doubles winners:  (Rafał Zasuwa, Paweł Spratek)
 January 5–6, 2016: FIL Natural Junior Track World Cup #2 in  Seiser Alm
 Men's natural singles winner:  Jack Leslie
 Women's natural singles winner:  Daniela Mittermair
 Open natural track doubles winners:  (Simone Scalet, Simone Gaio)
 January 17, 2016: FIL Natural Junior Track World Cup #3 in  Umhausen
 Men's natural singles winner:  Fabian Achenrainer
 Women's natural singles winner:  Teresa Mauerer
 Open natural track doubles winners:  (Josef Limmer, Florian Limmer)
 January 23–24, 2016: FIL Natural Junior Track World Cup #4 (final) in  Kindberg
 Men's natural singles winner:  Florian Markt
 Women's natural singles winner:  Teresa Mauerer
 Open natural track doubles winners:  (Manuel Gaio, Nicolo Debertolis)

Speed skating

2015–16 ISU Speed Skating World Cup
 November 13–15, 2015: ISU LTSS World Cup #1 in  Calgary

 The  won both the gold and overall medal tallies.
 November 20–22, 2015: ISU LTSS World Cup #2 in  Salt Lake City

The  won the overall medal tally.
 December 4–6, 2015: ISU LTSS World Cup #3 in  Inzell

 The  won both the gold and overall medal tallies.
 December 11–13, 2015: ISU LTSS World Cup #4 in  Heerenveen #1

 The  won both the gold and overall medal tallies. 
 January 29–31: ISU LTSS World Cup #5 in  Stavanger

  won the gold medal tally. The  won the overall medal tally.
 March 11–13: ISU LTSS World Cup #6 (final) in  Heerenveen #2

 The  won both the gold and overall medal tallies.

Speed Skating ISU Junior World Cup 2015–2016
 November 14–15, 2015: ISU Junior LTSS World Cup #1 in  Groningen
 Men's junior 500 m winner:  Viktor Mushtakov
 Men's junior 1000 m winner:  Mikhail Kazelin
 Men's junior 1500 m winner:  Marcel Bosker
 Men's junior 3000 m winner:  Marcel Bosker
 Men's junior mass start winner:  Marcel Bosker
 Men's junior team sprint winners: 
 Women's junior 500 m winner:  Xue Lin
 Women's junior 1000 m winner:  Rio Yamada
 Women's junior 1500 m winner:  Ayano Sato
 Women's junior 3000 m winner:  Mei Han
 Women's junior mass start winner:  Ayano Sato
 Women's junior team sprint winners:  
 November 28–29, 2015: ISU Junior LTSS World Cup #2 in  Berlin
 Men's junior 500 m winner:  Tatsuya Shinhama
 Women's junior 500 m winner:  Darya Kachanova
 Men's junior 1000 m winner:  Viktor  Mushtakov
 Women's junior 1000 m winner:  Darya Kachanova
 Men's junior 1500 m winner:  Viktor  Mushtakov
 Women's junior 1500 m winner:  Mei Han
 Men's junior 3000 m winner:  Marcel Bosker
 Women's junior 3000 m winner:  Ayano Sato
 Men's junior mass start winner:  Min-Seok Kim
 Women's junior mass start winner:  Ayano Sato
 Men's team sprint winners: 
 Women's team sprint winners: 
 January 16–17, 2015: ISU Junior LTSS World Cup #3 in  Baselga di Pinè
 Women's junior 500 m winner:  Darya Kachanova
 Men's junior 500 m winner:  Marten Liiv
 Women's junior 1500 m winner:  Ji-Woo Park
 Men's junior 1500 m winner:  Ki-Woong Park
 Women's junior team pursuit winners: 
 Men's junior team pursuit winners: 
 Women's junior 1000 m winner:  Darya Kachanova
 Men's junior 1000 m winner:  Francesco Tescari
 Women's junior 3000 m winner:  Ji-Woo Park
 Men's junior 3000 m winner:  Marcel Bosker
 Women's junior mass start winner:  Cho-Won Park
 Men's junior mass start winner:  Marcel Bosker

Other long track speed skating events and Winter Youth Olympics
 January 9–10: 2016 European Speed Skating Championships in  Minsk
 Men's Allround winner:  Sven Kramer
 Women's Allround winner:  Martina Sáblíková
 February 11–14: 2016 World Single Distance Speed Skating Championships in  Kolomna
 The  won both the gold and overall medal tallies.
 February 13–19: 2016 Winter Youth Olympics in  Lillehammer
 Boys' 500 m winners:   LI Yanzhe;   Kazuki Sakakibara;   CHUNG Jae-woong
 Boys' 1500 m winners:   Kim Min-seok;   Daichi Horikawa;   Daan Baks
 Boys' mass start winners:   Kim Min-seok;   CHUNG Jae-woong;   Allan Dahl Johansson
 Girls' 500 m winners:   KIM Min-sun;   Mei Han;   LI Huawei
 Girls' 1500 m winners:   Park Ji-woo;   Mei Han;   Noemi Bonazza
 Girls' mass start winners:   Park Ji-woo;   Mei Han;   KIM Min-sun
 Mixed NOC team sprint winners:   Team 6;   Team 9;   Team 10
 February 27–28: 2016 World Sprint Speed Skating Championships in  Seoul
 Men's overall winner:  Pavel Kulizhnikov
 Women's overall winner:  Brittany Bowe
 February 29 – March 6: World University Speed Skating Championship in  Baselga di Pinè
 Men's 500 m #1 winner:  Mirko Giacomo Nenzi
 Men's 500 m #2 winner:  Mirko Giacomo Nenzi
 Women's 500 m #1 winner:  Li Qishi
 Women's 500 m #2 winner:  Li Qishi
 Men's 1000 m winner:  Mirko Giacomo Nenzi
 Women's 1000 m winner:  Li Qishi
 Men's 1500 m winner:  Konrád Nagy
 Women's 1500 m winner:  Katarzyna Woźniak
 Women's 3000 m winner:  Nana Takahashi
 Men's 5000 m winner:  Davide Ghiotto
 Women's 5000 m winner:  Nana Takahashi
 Men's 10000 m winner:  Davide Ghiotto
 Men's mass start winner:  Riccardo Bugari
 Women's mass start winner:  Annemarie Boer
 Men's team sprint winners:  
 Women's team sprint winners: 
 Men's team pursuit winners: 
 Women's team pursuit winners: 
 March 5–6: 2016 World Allround Speed Skating Championships in  Berlin
 Men's overall winner:  Sven Kramer
 Women's overall winner:  Martina Sáblíková
 March 11–13: 2016 World Junior Speed Skating Championships in  Changchun
 Men's overall winner:  Benjamin Donnelly
 Women's overall winner:  Elizaveta Kazelina

2015–16 ISU Short Track Speed Skating World Cup
 October 30 – November 1, 2015: ISU STSS World Cup #1 in  Montreal

  won the gold medal tally. South Korea, and  won 7 overall medals each.
 November 6–8, 2015: ISU STSS World Cup #2 in  Toronto

  won the gold medal tally. South Korea and  won 11 overall medals each.
 December 4–6, 2015: ISU STSS World Cup #3 in  Nagoya

  won the gold medal tally.  won the overall medal tally.
 December 11–13, 2015: ISU STSS World Cup #4 in  Shanghai

  won both the gold and overall medal tallies.
 February 5–7: ISU STSS World Cup #5 in  Dresden

  won the gold medal tally.  won the overall medal tally.
 February 12–14: ISU STSS World Cup #6 (final) in  Dordrecht

  and  won 3 gold medals each. South Korea won the overall medal tally.

Other short track speed skating events and Winter Youth Olympics
 January 22–24: 2016 European Short Track Speed Skating Championships in  Sochi

  won the gold medal tally. The  won the overall medal tally.
 January 29–31: 2016 World Junior Short Track Speed Skating Championships in  Sofia

  won both the gold and overall medal tallies.
 February 14–20: 2016 Winter Youth Olympics in  Lillehammer
 Boys' 500 m winners:   HONG Kyung-hwan;   Kazuki Yoshinaga;   Ma Wei
 Boys' 1000 m winners:   HWANG Dae-heon;   Ma Wei;   LIU Shaoang
 Girls' 500 m winners:   ZANG Yize;   Petra Jászapáti;   Katrin Manoilova
 Girls' 1000 m winners:   KIM Ji-yoo;   LEE Su-youn;   Anna Seidel
 Mixed NOC team relay winners:   Team B;   Team C;   Team F
 March 11–13: 2016 World Short Track Speed Skating Championships in  Seoul
 Men's overall winner:  Han Tianyu
 Women's overall winner:  Choi Min-jeong

See also
 2016 in athletics (track and field)
 2016 in skiing
 2016 in sports

References

External links
 Federation of International Bandy
 The International Bobsleigh and Skeleton Federation
 World Curling Federation
 International Skating Union
 International Ice Hockey Federation
 International Luge Federation

Ice sports
Ice sports by year
Ice sports